Barbara Potter won in the final 6–2, 6–2 against Helen Kelesi.

Seeds
A champion seed is indicated in bold text while text in italics indicates the round in which that seed was eliminated.

  Manuela Maleeva (semifinals)
  Mary Joe Fernández (first round)
  Barbara Potter (champion)
  Helen Kelesi (final)
  Anne Minter (second round)
  Halle Cioffi (semifinals)
  Peanut Louie-Harper (quarterfinals)
  Anne Smith (first round)

Draw

References
 1988 Pringles Light Classic draw

Singles